Fire Down Under is the third studio album by American heavy metal band Riot, released in 1981, it's the last album to feature original vocalist Guy Speranza. The song "Flashbacks" is dedicated to Neal Kay, a British DJ who supported heavy metal in the UK during the new wave of British heavy metal.

The album was re-issued on CD in 1997 by the German-based High Vaultage label, utilizing a new, controversial remix by former Riot producer Steve Loeb, and in 1999 by Metal Blade Records in the U.S., this time featuring the original Elektra mix. The album was reissued in 2014 courtesy of Varese Sarabande. All three versions contain various bonus tracks recorded for the original Capitol Records version of Fire Down Under which the band were unhappy with. Capitol dropped the band for being "too heavy" after hearing the final version subsequently released by Elektra Records.. In 2018 the album was reissued, remastered and with six bonus tracks, by Rock Candy Records.

Track listing

Personnel

Band members
 Guy Speranza - vocals
 Mark Reale - guitar
 Rick Ventura - guitar
 Kip Leming - bass
 Sandy Slavin - drums

Production
Steve Loeb, Billy Arnell - producers
Rod Hui - engineer, mixing
Howie Weinberg - mastering

Cover versions and appearances
The song "Swords and Tequila" is featured in the video game Brütal Legend.
The song "Swords and Tequila" was covered by the band "Salvación"

Chart performance

References

Riot V albums
1981 albums
Elektra Records albums